Fouzia Bhatti (Urdu: فوزیہ بھٹی) (born 9 August 1979) is an Urdu language author, poet, and columnist from Pakistan.

Career
Her given name is Fouzia Bano, but she opted to use her father's surname, Bhatti, in order to publish books. Bano has taken an interest in writing all her life, writing and publishing her first poem in the urdu newspaper Nawa-e-Waqt at the young age of 13. Bano has proven to be very active in both the writing and activism communities throughout her life, interviewing people for the Jang Group forum when she was 15.
Bano served as a part of the visiting faculty of the University of Central Punjab, during which she taught magazine development and functional urdu.

Bano has published many books in the urdu language, including a collection of her short stories titled ‘Meri kahaniyan’ . In her books, Bano writes in favour of women in light of gender inequality. Bano's books contain only female protagonists, as a way of shedding light on the social inequality of women. Bano has also used her social following continuously to speak out against the social injustice and prejudices against women. Most of her books fall in the feminist literature genre.

Bano has written 7 books, in the span of 10 years, in which she explores philosophy and goes in depth of the human spirit and the indomitable nature of it. Bano is currently working on a new novel, expected to be released in 2024, titled 'Be-Zuban'.

Bano has held the position of creative director in various ad companies. She has collaborated closely with the Punjabi government on a number of initiatives, such as the Ujala programme, and has written creatively for print materials for the Metro service.

Bano has been affiliated with the World Health Organisation since 2017. She is currently serving in Africa on UN deployment, where she has served since 2019.

Personal life 
Bano's date of birth is 9th August of 1979, and was born and raised in Lahore. She was raised as the second-youngest of eight siblings. She attended Allama Iqbal primary school, and did her matriculation from Government Pilot secondary school. She then went on to attend Government College Gulberg Lahore, where she attained a degree in journalism and political science. She enrolled at the University of Punjab in 2012 to study mass communication, then returned again in 2014 to study international affairs.

Bibliography
 ح
 محرم
 Tum jo itne arse baad miley ho
 Mohabbat se mohabbat tak
 Youn tanha mat chalo
 Tamam umer usi ki rahi (slated for 2017 release)
 Be-Zuban (coming 2024)

See also
 List of Pakistani poets
 List of Pakistani writers
 List of Urdu language poets
 List of Urdu language writers

References

External links
 Bhatti on Twitter
 Mehram by Bhatti 
 Bhatti columns
 Bhatti in Studio One on Punjab Tv
 "Pather Ki Aurat", a short story by Bhatti

1979 births
Living people
Poets from Lahore
Pakistani poets
Urdu-language poets from Pakistan
Pakistani dramatists and playwrights
Pakistani columnists
Pakistani television writers
Nigar Award winners
Writers from Lahore
University of the Punjab alumni
Women writers from Punjab, Pakistan
Women television writers
Pakistani women columnists